The 1972 Atlanta Falcons season was the franchise's seventh year in the National Football League (NFL). The team failed to improve on their previous season's output of 7–6–1, finishing 7–7 and failing to reach the playoffs. Standing at 7–5 the Falcons traveled to San Francisco with the NFC West division title on the line. However, the Falcons were never in the game and saw their playoff hopes dim with a 20–0 shutout loss. Facing the Kansas City Chiefs in their final game of the season, Running Back Dave Hampton surpassed the 1,000-yard mark. However, a play later he was thrown for a six-yard loss to end the season with 995 yards, as the Falcons lost and finished 7–7.

Offseason

NFL Draft  
advantage in time of possession did not score any offensive points

Personnel

Staff

Roster

Schedule

Standings

References

External links 
 1972 Atlanta Falcons at Pro-Football-Reference.com

Atlanta Falcons seasons
Atlanta Falcons
Atlanta